Northern Baltic Communist Youth League (in Estonian: Põhja-Balti Kommunistlik Noorsoo Liit, abbreviated PBKNL) was a political youth movement in Estonia. PBKNL emerged in 1918 following a split from the Social Democratic Youth League (SDNÜ), after the Tallinn congress of SDNÜ.

Political history of Estonia
Political organizations based in Estonia